Live at Pompeii is a live album and film by David Gilmour, the guitarist of Pink Floyd. It was recorded at the Amphitheatre of Pompeii. It documents his 2015–16 world tour to promote his album, Rattle That Lock (2015). The concert was directed by Gavin Elder. The album was released on 29 September 2017 and is available on CD, LP, digital download, DVD, BD and deluxe box set containing the CD album and BD, plus a bonus exclusive BD of extras.

Promotion
A digital single, "Rattle That Lock (Live at Pompeii 2016)" was released to promote the album on 28 July 2017. "One of These Days (Live at Pompeii 2016)" was also released as a single on 8 September 2017, and "Run Like Hell (Live at Pompeii 2016)" was released as a single on 29 September 2017.

Gilmour's official YouTube channel released preview videos during the period leading up to release. The full video for "Rattle That Lock" was uploaded on 2 August 2017. An excerpt from "One of These Days" was also uploaded on the same day. Later, on the 9 August an excerpt from "A Boat Lies Waiting" was uploaded. An excerpt from "Today" was uploaded on 23 August 2017. On 30 August 2017 an excerpt from "Time" was uploaded. As well as preview videos an electronic press kit (EPK) was uploaded in three parts to the channel. On 8 September 2017 the full video of "One of These Days" was uploaded to the YouTube channel, followed by "Run Like Hell" on 29 September. Promo videos for "Dancing Right In Front of Me", "Wish You Were Here", "The Great Gig in the Sky", "The Girl in the Yellow Dress"  and "Comfortably Numb" were all added during the days before the album's release.

Cinema
On 13 September 2017 there was a worldwide cinema screening of Live at Pompeii prior to its 29 September release. The cinema version omitted some of the songs which feature on the full release.

Cinema track listing

 Intro film featuring rehearsals and interviews.
 "5 A.M."
 "Rattle That Lock"
 "What Do You Want from Me"
 "The Great Gig In the Sky"
 "A Boat Lies Waiting"
 "Wish You Were Here"
 "In Any Tongue"
 "High Hopes"
 "One of These Days"
 "Shine On You Crazy Diamond"
 "Sorrow"
 "Run Like Hell"
 "Time / Breathe (Reprise)"
 "Comfortably Numb"
 "Beauty" (end credits) (studio recording)

The songs "Faces of Stone", "The Blue", "Money", "Fat Old Sun", "Coming Back to Life", "On an Island" and "Today" were omitted from the cinema version.

Television
On 22 December 2017 a 60-minute TV version of Live at Pompeii premiered on Arte, a Franco-German broadcaster. The tracklist included "Faces of Stone" and "Coming Back to Life", but was greatly edited, cutting out portions of "Sorrow" and "Comfortably Numb".

TV track listing
 "5 A.M."
 "Rattle That Lock"
 "Faces of Stone"
 "The Great Gig In the Sky"
 "Wish You Were Here"
 "In Any Tongue"
 "Coming Back to Life"
 "Sorrow"
 "Comfortably Numb"

Track listing

CD, LP and download

DVD and BD
Concert footage
 "5 A.M."
 "Rattle That Lock"
 "Faces of Stone"
 "What Do You Want from Me"
 "The Blue"
 "The Great Gig In the Sky"
 "A Boat Lies Waiting"
 "Wish You Were Here"
 "Money"
 "In Any Tongue"
 "High Hopes"
 "One of These Days"
 "Shine On You Crazy Diamond"
 "Fat Old Sun"
 "Coming Back to Life"
 "On an Island"
 "Today"
 "Sorrow"
 "Run Like Hell"
 "Time" / "Breathe (Reprise)"
 "Comfortably Numb"
 "Beauty" (closing credits) (studio recording)
Pompeii Then and Now documentary.

Deluxe box set
The boxset contains the 2-CD album and the film on BD. It also contains the following:

Bonus BD of live material and documentaries
 South America concert footage:
 "Astronomy Domine" (Syd Barrett)
 "Us and Them" (Wright / Waters)
 "Today"
 "Time" / "Breathe (Reprise)"
 "Comfortably Numb"

 Wrocław, Poland, June 2016 with the NFM Wrocław Philharmonic Orchestra concert footage:
 "5 A.M."
 "Rattle That Lock"
 "Dancing Right In Front of Me" (Gilmour)
 "The Girl In the Yellow Dress" (with Leszek Możdżer) (Gilmour / Samson)
 "In Any Tongue"

 Europe 2015 documentary
 South America 2015 documentary
 North America 2016 documentary
 Europe 2016 documentary
 BBC documentary: David Gilmour: Wider Horizons

Collectables
 24-page hardback photo book
 8-page Pompeii guide titled The Amphitheatre at Pompeii – An Interview with Mary Beard
 4 postcards
 2-sided poster (the obverse replicates the album artwork, the reverse is a replica of the posters used to promote the Pompeii shows)

Personnel
Pompeii and Wrocław
David Gilmour – electric guitars, acoustic guitars, classical guitar, console steel guitar, lead and backing vocals, cymbals on "One of These Days", whistling on "In Any Tongue"
Chester Kamen – electric guitars, acoustic guitars, classical guitar, 12-string acoustic guitar, high-strung acoustic guitar on "Comfortably Numb", backing vocals, harmonica on "The Blue"
Guy Pratt – bass guitars, double bass, backing vocals, co-lead vocals on "Run Like Hell"
Greg Phillinganes – piano, keyboards, backing vocals, co-lead vocals on "Time" 
Chuck Leavell – organ, keyboards, accordion, backing vocals, co-lead vocals on "Comfortably Numb"
Steve DiStanislao – drums, percussion, backing vocals, aeoliphone on "One of These Days"
João Mello – saxophones, clarinet, additional keyboards on "The Blue", high-strung acoustic guitar on "In Any Tongue"
Bryan Chambers – backing vocals, lead vocals on "In Any Tongue" and "The Great Gig in the Sky", tambourine
Lucita Jules – backing vocals, lead vocals on "The Great Gig in the Sky"
Louise Clare Marshall (Pompeii only) – backing vocals, cowbell, lead vocals on "The Great Gig in the Sky"

with:
Leszek Możdżer – piano on "The Girl in the Yellow Dress" (Wrocław, 25 June 2016)
Wrocław Philharmonic Orchestra conducted by Zbigniew Preisner (Wrocław, 25 June 2016)

South America
David Gilmour – electric guitars, lead and backing vocals
Phil Manzanera – electric guitars, acoustic guitars, backing vocals, high-strung acoustic guitar on "Comfortably Numb"
Jon Carin – piano, keyboards, electric guitars, backing vocals, co-lead vocals on "Time" and "Comfortably Numb"
Kevin McAlea – keyboards
Steve DiStanislao – drums, percussion, backing vocals
João Mello – saxophones
Bryan Chambers – backing vocals
Lucita Jules – backing vocals

Charts

Weekly charts

Year-end charts

Certifications

See also

Pink Floyd: Live at Pompeii

Notes

References

External links
Gilmour's homepage

David Gilmour live albums
David Gilmour video albums
Albums produced by David Gilmour
2017 live albums
2017 video albums
Live video albums
Pompeii in popular culture